Saint Catherine's College Armagh (Irish: Coláiste Chaitríona Ard Mhacha) is an all level Catholic school in Armagh, Northern Ireland. It caters for the 11-18 age group and is associated with the international group of schools served by the Society of the Sacred Heart.

History
It was formed in 1973 when the existing Convent of the Sacred Heart Grammar and secondary schools in the city were re-organized on a comprehensive basis to provide secondary education for all the Catholic girls of the greater Armagh area. Saint Catherine's College was a boarding school in the earlier 1900s and was formed by the Sacred Heart trust to provide education for young girls of all backgrounds.

Facilities
Saint Catherine's College is situated on a  site off the Convent Road in Armagh and the existing school buildings have been refurbished and upgraded to ensure the provision of the most modern technological and sporting facilities. A £1.5 million building program has recently been completed with the construction of a new five classroom Information and Communication Technology building. New facilities have also been added to the Irish Medium Unit.

Academics
The school caters for the full range of ability and comprises: Key Stage 3 (Years 8, 9 and 10), Key Stage 4 (Years 11 and 12) and Sixth Form (Years 13 and 14).

In 2018, 73.3% of its entrants achieved five or more GCSEs at grades A* to C, including the core subjects English and Maths. Also in 2018, 81.4% of its entrants to the A-level exam achieved A* to C grades.

An Sruth Gaeilge, which is an integral part of Saint Catherine's College, provides quality Irish Medium education for those who wish to build on the Irish Language competences acquired in the Bunscoileanna.

Sports
The school is involved in many sporting activities including Gaelic football and camogie. In 2019, the school won the Lidl All-Ireland Schools Junior A Championship Gaelic football Final.

Notable former pupils
 Michelle Gildernew (born 1970) - Sinn Féin politician
 Carla O'Brien (born 1983) - journalist

References

External links
 Official website

Buildings and structures in Armagh (city)
Catholic secondary schools in Northern Ireland
Schools in County Armagh
Secondary schools in County Armagh